Josef Florian (9 February 1873 – 29 December 1941, both in Stará Říše in Moravia) was a Czech book publisher and translator.

He was famous for the high quality of books he published in his small publishing company in Stará Říše. Both local authors and foreign translations were published in topics including philosophy, theology, medieval literature and scientific studies — totalling 387 publications in editions Dobré dílo, Studium, Nova et Vetera, Kurs and Archy.

External links
 Biography (in Czech)

1873 births
1941 deaths
Czech publishers (people)
Czech translators
People from Jihlava District
Czechoslovak publishers (people)
Austro-Hungarian people